Kaleemullah (born 24 December 1990) is a Pakistani-born cricketer who plays for the Oman national cricket team. He made his Twenty20 International (T20I) debut for Oman in the 2017 Desert T20 Challenge against the Netherlands on 15 January 2017. In January 2018, he was named in Oman's squad for the 2018 ICC World Cricket League Division Two tournament. He made his List A debut for Oman on 8 February 2018.

In August 2018, he was named in Oman's squad for the 2018 Asia Cup Qualifier tournament. In October 2018, he was named in Oman's squad for the 2018 ICC World Cricket League Division Three tournament. In December 2018, he was named in Oman's team for the 2018 ACC Emerging Teams Asia Cup.

In March 2019, he was named in Oman's team for the 2019 ICC World Cricket League Division Two tournament in Namibia. Oman finished in the top four places in the tournament, therefore gaining One Day International (ODI) status. Kaleemullah made his ODI debut for Oman on 27 April 2019, against Namibia, in the tournament's final.

In September 2019, he was named in Oman's squad for the 2019 ICC T20 World Cup Qualifier tournament. In November 2019, he was named in Oman's squad for the 2019 ACC Emerging Teams Asia Cup in Bangladesh. In September 2021, he was named in Oman's squad for the 2021 ICC Men's T20 World Cup.

References

External links
 

1990 births
Living people
Omani cricketers
Oman One Day International cricketers
Oman Twenty20 International cricketers
Cricketers from Gujranwala
Pakistani emigrants to Oman
Pakistani expatriates in Oman